Atlanta Esports Ventures (AEV) is an American venture capital firm. AEV is a partnership between Cox Enterprises and Province, Inc. The firm has investments in two Atlanta-based esports teams in the Atlanta Reign of the Overwatch League and the Atlanta FaZe for the Call of Duty League.

History 
Atlanta Esports Ventures was founded in 2018 as a partnership between Cox Enterprises, a global conglomerate headquartered in Atlanta, Georgia, and Province Inc., a financial advisory firm based in Las Vegas, Nevada. Paul Hamilton was selected as the company's president and CEO due to his values and history working with Cox.

Investments

Atlanta Reign 

On August 2, 2018, it was announced that Atlanta Esports Ventures purchased one of Activision Blizzard's expansion slots in the Overwatch League at an estimated $30 million to $60 million. Activision Blizzard had been expecting to sell Atlanta one of the expansion slots, as president and CEO of Activision Blizzard Esports Leagues Pete Vlastlica noted, "We always had our eye on [Atlanta], from the beginning. It [was] just a matter of when." The team, Atlanta Reign, became the first esports team to officially represent the city of Atlanta.

In October 2019, AEV purchased a property for the Atlanta Reign in Atlanta to act as its headquarters for a reported million.

Atlanta FaZe 

On May 2, 2019, Activision Blizzard announced that AEV had purchased one of the first five franchise slots for the Call of Duty League. According to ESPN, the publisher was looking to sell slots for approximately $25 million per team. "We have the opportunity to — once again — play a pivotal role in Atlanta's diverse esports community by bringing the future of Call of Duty esports to the city," said Hamilton in a release at the time. AEV and FaZe Clan partnered together for the team, and in October 2019, they announced that the team would be named the Atlanta FaZe.

References

External links
 Atlanta Esports Ventures (company website)

Financial services companies established in 2018
2018 establishments in Georgia (U.S. state)
Companies based in Atlanta
Venture capital firms of the United States
Atlanta Reign
Esports organizations
American companies established in 2018